Saatchi is a Persian and Turkish surname and word. The word "saatchi" (sā'ātchi), which means "watchmaker", originates from Ottoman Turkish (Modern Turkish: "saatçi"), derived from "saat" ("watch", from Arabic "ساعة") with the suffix "-çi". Albanian surname, Sahatçiu, is also derived from the Turkish word "saatçi" as a result of the Ottoman rule in Albania.

Surnames 
Notable people with the name include:

Saatchi 
Charles Saatchi, founder and owner of the Saatchi Gallery in London
Maurice Saatchi, Baron Saatchi, ex-chairman of the British Conservative Party

Sahatçiu 
Rita Sahatçiu Ora, British singer 
Besim Sahatçiu, Kosovo Albanian film director

References 

Arabic-language surnames
Persian-language surnames
Turkish-language surnames